Tetramethylazodicarboxamide (also known as TMAD and diamide) is a reagent used in biochemistry for oxidation of thiols in proteins to disulfides. It has also been used as a reagent in the Mitsunobu reaction in place of diethyl azodicarboxylate.

References

Further reading

Azo compounds
Reagents for organic chemistry